The Rolls-Royce RB.108 was a British jet engine designed in the mid-1950s by Rolls-Royce specifically for use as a VTOL lift engine. It was also used to provide horizontal thrust in the Short SC.1.

Design and development
The RB.108 was the first direct-lift turbojet produced by Rolls-Royce. It originated from a VTOL concept in which Alan A. Griffith proposed using a small number of specialised lift engines in a VTOL aircraft, separate from the engines which provided forward propulsion. Its power output (thrust) was not high enough for use as a practical engine in a production aircraft and was used only for research into VTOL. It was constructed from conventional materials. (The next engine, the RB.162, would have a compressor built mainly from glass-fibre composite and have a higher T/W ratio.) The RB.108 bearings and oil system were designed to operate with an engine attitude envelope which covered engine and aircraft tilting while transitioning between hovering and forward flight. When a fifth engine was installed in the SC.1 to provide forward thrust it had to be mounted at about 45 degrees to remain within the envelope. The exhaust was directed horizontally with a curved jetpipe.

Operational history
The RB.108 was used in the Short SC.1, which used four for lift with an additional one mounted at an angle at the rear for propulsion, and the Dassault Balzac V, which used eight vertically mounted RB.108s for lift. The Vereinigte Flugtechnische Werke (VFW) SG 1262 used five RB.108s, three mounted in tandem on the centreline, with one RB.108 either side.

The RB.108 was also the intended powerplant for several other VTOL aircraft designs, including one by Dornier.

A similar lift jet was designed by Bristol Siddeley, the BS.59, with a thrust of 8,000 lb the engine was intended for the projected Focke-Wulf Fw 260.

Applications
 Dassault Balzac V
 Short SC.1
 VFW SG 1262 Schwebegestell

Specifications (RB.108)

See also

References

Notes

Bibliography

Gunston, Bill. World Encyclopedia of Aero Engines. Cambridge, England. Patrick Stephens Limited, 1989.

External links

A photograph of an RB.108
RB.108 origins
The Short SC.1
Vereinigte Flugtechnische Werke SG 1262
Advertisement from Flight magazine - September 1960

RB.108
1950s turbojet engines
Lift jet